Rebecca Nyandeng of Mabior (born 15 July 1956) is a South Sudanese politician. She has been one of the Vice Presidents of South Sudan in the unity government since February 2020. She served as the Minister of Roads and Transport for the autonomous government of Southern Sudan, and as an advisor for the President of South Sudan on gender and human rights from 2007 to 2014. She is the widow of Dr. John Garang de Mabior, the late first Vice President of Sudan and the President of the Government of South Sudan, and the mother of Akuol de Mabior. She is from the Dinka tribe of Twic East County of South Sudan.

Early life
She was born on 15 July 1956 in Bor Town. In 1986 she travelled to Cuba for military training.

Role in the Government of South Sudan 
After the death of Dr. John Garang, General Salva Kiir took over his positions and became the first Vice President of Sudan and the President of the Government of South Sudan and commander in chief of SPLM/A. General Kiir appointed Rebecca Nyandeng De Mabior as the Minister of Roads and Transport for the Government of South Sudan.

She continued to be a strong advocate for the implementation of the Comprehensive Peace Agreement signed by Dr. John Garang before his death on 30 July 2005. She continued to support the implementation of the peace process until the South attained independence on 9 July 2011. During that same year when her husband died Madam Rebecca visited the United States of America and met with President George W. Bush. She offered a message of appreciation for the American involvement in the quest for peace in South Sudan. In 2009 President Obama continued the efforts with Secretary Clinton and Ambassador Rice to see that the peace agreement is implemented in Sudan.

Madam Rebecca also received an interview by NPR. She spoke of her commitment to the liberation of South Sudan while she also respects the necessity of a united Sudan under the New Sudan Vision created by Dr John Garang in 1983. She visited Grinnell College and Iowa State University, the Iowa universities where her late husband completed his education before the Second Sudanese Civil War broke out in 1983. Late Dr. John Garang and his wife Rebecca have six children who are active supporters of peace and stability in the new Republic of South Sudan.

According to the Sudan Tribune, Nyandeng met with South Sudanese president Salva Kiir Mayardit on 22 December 2013 to discuss security in the wake of the 2013 South Sudanese political crisis.

Comprehensive Peace Agreement 
Rebecca Nyandeng has expressed dissatisfaction with the way the government of Sudan in Khartoum implements the Comprehensive Peace Agreement (CPA). During the years of war, she joined the Southern army known today as Sudan People's Liberation Army and the Sudan People's Liberation Movement. She is known for her support for the right of self-determination for South Sudan although she has nothing against the united Sudan under a democratic rule of law. Millions of Southern Sudanese have been affected by the war between the North and South Sudan which has a long history from the time the British left Sudan in 1956. As a result of war over 2 million lives in South Sudan have been lost and four million South Sudanese are both internally displaced and externally living in other countries as refugees. After the arrival of peace in South Sudan, repatriation process is making headlines once in a while by the United Nations.

References

External links 
 Interview with NPR
 

Living people
De Mabior family
Vice-presidents of South Sudan
Women vice presidents
Sudan People's Liberation Movement politicians
Government ministers of South Sudan
Dinka people
21st-century South Sudanese politicians
1956 births
Women government ministers of South Sudan
21st-century South Sudanese women politicians